Bukovany is a municipality and village in Hodonín District in the South Moravian Region of the Czech Republic. It has about 700 inhabitants.

History
The first written mention of Bukovany is from 1131.

References

Villages in Hodonín District